Ust-Bartaga (Bartağatamaq) is a rural locality (a village) in Verkhnesuyansky Selsoviet, Karaidelsky District, Bashkortostan, Russia. The population was 87 as of 2010. There are 2 streets.

Geography 
Ust-Bartaga is located 73 km northeast of Karaidel (the district's administrative centre) by road. Sedyash is the nearest rural locality.

References 

Rural localities in Karaidelsky District